DNB may refer to:

 Dance Notation Bureau, a non-profit organization founded to preserve choreographic works
 De Nederlandsche Bank, the Dutch central bank
 Departure from nucleate boiling, in boiling heat transfer
 The Day/Night Band, the high sensitivity channel of the Visible Infrared Imaging Radiometer Suite (VIIRS) on board the Suomi NPP and Joint Polar Satellite System (JPSS) series satellites capable of night time imaging. 
 Deutsche Nationalbibliothek, the German National Library
 , a Nazi German news agency administered by Heinz Lorenz
 The Dictionary of National Biography, a reference work on notable figures from British history
 Diplomate of National Board, an Indian credential for healthcare providers
 DNB ASA, a Norwegian financial services group
 Den norske Bank (DnB), a former Norwegian bank, now part of DNB ASA
 Drum and bass (DnB), an electronic music style
 Dunbartonshire, historic county in Scotland, Chapman code
 Dun & Bradstreet (retired NYSE ticker symbol DNB), an American business information company

See also
 DNB Arena (disambiguation)